The Barnett J4B is a small gyroplane marketed in the United States by Barnett Rotorcraft for homebuilding. Originally flown as the J-3M with an open cockpit and fabric-covered sides, later versions have a fiberglass cockpit pod either partially or fully enclosing the pilot. Apart from the basic J4B, versions available in 2007 included the BRC540 (two seats side-by-side) and J4B2 (two seats in tandem).

Variants
J-3M
Original variant with  Continental A65 engine.
J-4M
Improved J-3M with  Continental C85 engine.
J4B
Single-seat autogyro with 23 ft rotor.
J4B-2
Two-seat variant of the J4B with a 25ft 4in rotor.

Specifications (typical J4B)

References

Citations

Bibliography
 
 Popular Rotorcraft Association (archived)

External links
 Barnett Rotorcraft company website

1970s United States sport aircraft
Single-engined pusher autogyros